The 2020–21 season was Feyenoord's 113th season of play, the club's 65th season in the Eredivisie and its 99th consecutive season in the top flight of Dutch football. Feyenoord entered the 2020–21 UEFA Europa League in the group stage.

Disney+ series

In February 2021, Feyenoord and The Walt Disney Company announced the production of a Disney+ series which would see the company producing a documentary about Feyenoord during the 2020–21. The series will consist of 8 episodes. In May 2021 Feyenoord announced that the series would be titled Dat ene woord - Feyenoord and would be available from August 27, 2021. It was later announced that the series would be getting a ninth episode, with the release of the first episode being pushed back to September 1st.

Friendlies

Competitions

Overview

Eredivisie

League table

Results by matchday

Matches

European competition play-offs
Four teams play for a spot in the 2021–22 UEFA Europa Conference League second qualifying round.

KNVB Cup

Europa League

Group stage

Statistics

Player details

Appearances (Apps.) numbers are for appearances in competitive games only including sub appearances
Red card numbers denote: Numbers in parentheses represent red cards overturned for wrongful dismissal.
‡= Preseason squad or youth player, not a member of first team.

Hat-tricks

Clean sheets

Transfers

Summer windows

In:

 (return from loan)
 (return from loan)
 (return from loan)

 (on loan)

Out:

 (return from loan)

 (return from loan)
 (return from loan)
 (on loan)

 (on loan)

Winter window

In:

 (on loan)

Out:

 (on loan)
 (on loan)
 (on loan)
 (on loan)
 (on loan)
 (on loan)
 (on loan)
 (on loan)

References

External links

Feyenoord seasons
Feyenoord
2020–21 UEFA Europa League participants seasons